Acraea pudorina, the Kenyan fiery acraea, is a butterfly in the family Nymphalidae. It is found in central and southern Kenya and Tanzania.

Description
Very similar to Acraea acrita qv.

Taxonomy
Acraea pudorina is a member of the Acraea acrita species group. The other clade members are:
    
Acraea acrita
Acraea chaeribula
Acraea eltringhamiana
Acraea guluensis
Acraea lualabae
Acraea manca 
Acraea utengulensis

Classification of Acraea by Henning, Henning & Williams, Pierre. J. & Bernaud

Acraea (group acrita) Henning, 1993 
Acraea (Rubraea) Henning & Williams, 2010 
Acraea (Acraea) (supraspecies acrita) 
Acraea (Acraea)  Groupe egina Pierre & Bernaud, 2014

References

External links

Die Gross-Schmetterlinge der Erde 13: Die Afrikanischen Tagfalter. Plate XIII 55 b

Butterflies described in 1885
pudorina
Butterflies of Africa
Taxa named by Otto Staudinger